Wayne Khan (born 21 January 1991 in Cape Town) is a South African rugby union player, currently playing with the . His regular position is hooker, but he can also play as a flanker.

Career

Youth

Griffons
He made a further two substitute appearances for them in the remainder of that competition, but did not play in the Currie Cup tournament, turning out for the Under-21 team instead.

SWD Eagles

References

South African rugby union players
Living people
1991 births
Griffons (rugby union) players
SWD Eagles players
Rugby union hookers
Rugby union players from Cape Town